Pedro Correia de Barros (20 June 1911 – 2 February 1968) was a Portuguese navy officer and colonial administrator.

Biography
Barros was born in Loulé. He graduated from the Naval School in 1932. He also had taken the courses of seaplane military observer pilot (1937) and the general naval war course (1949). On 8 March 1957, Barros was appointed the Governor of Macau, replacing Joaquim Marques Esparteiro. He left office on 18 September 1959. He served as High Commissioner and Governor-General of Mozambique between 1958 and 1961.

In December 1966, political demonstrations and rioting against Portuguese rule in Macau occurred, which was known as the 12-3 incident. As a former governor, Barros was sent to investigate the present situation of Macau. He requested negotiations, but was rejected by the Guangdong government.

Honours
 Commander of Military Order of Aviz (27 September 1954)
 Grand-officer of Order of the Colonial Empire (2 September 1961)
 Officier of Order of the Black Star (France, 8 January 1954)
 Grand-officer of Order of the Star of Grand Comoro (Morocco, 5 June 1956)
 3rd Class Cross of Order of Naval Merit (Spain, 20 August 1965)

References

1911 births
1968 deaths
People from Loulé
Governors-General of Mozambique
Governors of Macau
Commanders of the Order of Aviz
Grand Officers of the Order of Aviz
Crosses of Naval Merit